Bourbon Community Building-Gymnasium is a historic gymnasium and community centre located at Bourbon, Marshall County, Indiana.  The gym was built in 1928 and demolished in 2021. and is a two-story, dark red and brown colored brick building with Colonial Revival style design elements.  It sits on a concrete foundation and has a barrel-vaulted roof.  The lawn terrace wall and steps, built in 1924, are a contributing structure.  The gym is associated with the Triton Junior–Senior High School.

It was listed on the National Register of Historic Places in 2015, and was delisted in 2021.

References

Event venues on the National Register of Historic Places in Indiana
Colonial Revival architecture in Indiana
Buildings and structures completed in 1928
Buildings and structures in Marshall County, Indiana
National Register of Historic Places in Marshall County, Indiana
Sports venues on the National Register of Historic Places in Indiana